The chief minister of Uttar Pradesh is the principal minister in chief of the Government of Uttar Pradesh. As per the Constitution of India, the governor is the state's de jure head, but de facto executive authority rests with the chief minister. Following elections to the Uttar Pradesh Legislative Assembly, the governor usually invites the party (or coalition) with a majority of seats to form the government. The governor appoints the chief minister, whose council of ministers are collectively responsible to the assembly. Given that he has the confidence of the assembly, the chief minister's term is for five years and is subject to no term limits.

On 26 January 1950 Govind Ballabh Pant, premier of United Provinces, became the first chief minister of the newly renamed Uttar Pradesh. Including him, 11 out of UP's 21 chief ministers belonged to the Indian National Congress. Among these is V. P. Singh, a future prime minister of India, as was Charan Singh of the Rashtriya Lok Dal. On ten occasions, most recently in 2002, the state has come under President's rule, leaving the office of chief minister vacant. UP has also had two women chief ministers—Sucheta Kripalani and Mayawati. Akhilesh Yadav of the Samajwadi Party served as the chief minister of Uttar Pradesh from 2012 to 2017; having taken the oath at 38 years of age, he is the youngest person to have held the office. Only four chief ministers completed their official tenure of five years: Sampurnanand, Mayawati ,Akhilesh Yadav, and Yogi Adityanath.

Yogi Adityanath of the Bharatiya Janata Party is serving as the incumbent chief minister since March 19, 2017.

Oath as the state chief minister 
The chief minister serves 5 years in the office. The following is the Oath of the Chief Minister of Uttar Pradesh:

Premier of United Provinces (1937–50) 
The United Provinces, headquartered in Allahabad was a province of British India that comprised present day Uttar Pradesh and Uttarakhand. Under the Government of India Act 1935, a bicameral legislature was set up with a legislative assembly and a legislative council.

Chief Ministers of Uttar Pradesh

Timeline

Notes

References

External links 
 "Chief Ministers of Uttar Pradesh". The Indian Express. 15 May 2007. Retrieved on 28 July 2013.

Uttar Pradesh
 
Chief Ministers
Uttar Pradesh politics-related lists